Saltinho may refer to the following places in Brazil:

 Saltinho, São Paulo
 Saltinho, Santa Catarina